Westminster Digital is a British social media marketing agency. The firm was used by Boris Johnson during his electoral campaign in the 2019 Conservative Party leadership election and during the 2019 United Kingdom general election.

Westminster Digital was incorporated in November 2017. The company raised capital through private investment.

During the 2019 Conservative Party (UK) leadership election Westminster Digital advised 6 out of the 10 leadership candidates on their communications and digital strategy, including Michael Gove, Dominic Raab, Sajid Javid and Matt Hancock. During the 2019 United Kingdom general election Westminster Digital worked with over 50 candidates.

References

External links 
 

2017 establishments in the United Kingdom
Technology companies established in 2017
Big data companies
Data management
Political campaign techniques
Political campaign technology
Prediction
Brexit
Government by algorithm